The Iowa Department of Homeland Security and Emergency Management, abbreviated to Iowa HSEMD, is Iowa's equivalent to the US Department of Homeland Security. It manages disasters, grants, and certain programs like 911.

History 
The HSEMD was founded on the 11 May 1965 as the State Civil Defense Agency.

The department has helped Dubuque County reviewing papers for disaster prevention. It also estimated costs of the Bee Branch Watershed Project.

Organization 
There are three branches of the HSEMD, the Response and Recovery branch and the chief of staff. All of them report to the director. The state of Iowa is broken down into districts.

Budget 
As of 2021, the budget of the HSEMD is $273,370,646.

Flood Mitigation Board 
The Flood Mitigation Board is given 6 billion dollars split over multiple cities that have flood projects like Cedar Rapids or Dubuque.

Criticism and lawsuits

Iowa City Against International Student Ban 
In 2020, Iowa City challenged the HSEMD on its ban on international students. The original lawsuit was made by Harvard. Iowa City's decision was to support international students.

See also 

 List of state departments of homeland security

References 

State agencies of Iowa
State departments of homeland security of the United States